The 1953–54 NBA season was the eighth season of the National Basketball Association. The season ended with the Minneapolis Lakers winning their 5th NBA Championship in 6 years, beating the Syracuse Nationals 4 games to 3 in the NBA Finals.  It was also the final time the Lakers would win an NBA Championship before the franchise moved to Los Angeles in 1960.

Notable occurrences
 The Indianapolis Olympians folded prior to the start of the season. Indianapolis would return to professional basketball with the Pacers of the ABA in 1967. The NBA returned to Indianapolis for the 1976–77 season, when the Pacers joined the Association as part of the NBA-ABA merger.
 The 1954 NBA All-Star Game was played in New York City, with the East beating the West 98–93 in overtime. Bob Cousy of the Boston Celtics won the game's MVP award.
 This marked the first year the NBA had a national television contract. The contract had the DuMont Television Network televising 13 games, paying 39,000 dollars for the rights.

Final standings

Eastern Division

Western Division

x – clinched playoff spot

Playoffs

Statistics leaders

Note: Prior to the 1969–70 season, league leaders in points, rebounds, and assists were determined by totals rather than averages.

NBA awards
Rookie of the Year: Ray Felix, Baltimore Bullets

All-NBA First Team:
George Mikan, Minneapolis Lakers
Harry Gallatin, New York Knicks
Dolph Schayes, Syracuse Nationals
Bob Cousy, Boston Celtics
Neil Johnston, Philadelphia Warriors

All-NBA Second Team:
Carl Braun, New York Knicks
Ed Macauley, Boston Celtics
Jim Pollard, Minneapolis Lakers
Paul Seymour, Syracuse Nationals
Bobby Wanzer, Rochester Royals

References
1953–54 NBA Season Summary basketball-reference.com. Retrieved December 10, 2010